Silk Silk Silk is a 1983 Indian Tamil-language film directed by Y.V.Gopikrishnan, starring Bhanuchander, Smitha and Raghuvaran .

Plot
A group of smugglers (Shah, Johnny, Viji and Balram) steal diamonds to sell on the black market. Shah runs off to Goa with the diamonds and plans to sell them himself. He's found murdered in his hotel room and the diamonds are missing. CBI officer Nirmal and police officer Ashok team up to solve the murder. They have a witness that saw a young woman enter his room and that's their only lead. Nirmal recognizes the suspect as his ex-girlfriend, Priya, but doesn't disclose this. Nirmal, Ashok and the smugglers are all searching for Priya. Nirmal runs into Priya look-alike Meena, a poor fisherwoman with an alcoholic father. Ashok arrests Meena assuming her to be Shah's murderer. Nirmal arranges for Meena to be bailed out of jail causing a rift between the two men. Nirmal runs into Priya and learns that she unwittingly smuggled the diamonds for Shah and returned it to him but is otherwise uninvolved in Shah's murder. Nirmal tries to clear both Priya and Meena but fails to do so. Both women are kidnapped by the smugglers. They have no information for the smugglers but Viji remembers a third woman that also looks like Priya and Meena. This third woman - Sheela - is involved in a deeper conspiracy involving Shah's murder. Nirmal, Priya and Meena must work together to unearth the mystery.

Cast
Smitha as Priya, Meena, Sheela
Bhanuchander as Nirmal Kumar
Raghuvaran as Ashok Kumar
Loose Mohan as Meena's father
Shyla as Viju
Balram as Balram
Johnny as Johnny
S. N. Parvathy as Ashok's mother

Soundtrack 
The film score and soundtrack was composed by M. S. Viswanathan. The soundtrack features four tracks, all written by Vaali.

Moracha (Mamutha Maharasa) - L. R. Eswari, S. N. Surendar 
Ennai Vittu - Vani Jairam, Jayachandran
Katcherika - S. Janaki
Jaani Jaani - S. Janaki

Trivia

Smitha became famous as Silk Smitha with this film. She got the name from Vandichakram.
The film provided break to both actors, Smitha as well as Raghuvaran.

References

External links 
 

1980 films
1983 films
Films scored by M. S. Viswanathan
1980s Tamil-language films